The UWA Student Guild is the official student representative body at the University of Western Australia, representing the interests of students to the university, government and the wider community, as well as providing services to students. The Guild's published mission is to be Western Australia's leading campus student representative organisation.

Background
The UWA Student Guild is the premier student representative body at the University of Western Australia. The vision of the UWA Student Guild is to be Australia's leading campus student representative organisation.

The Guild provides a number of services, and is instrumental in promoting and sustaining student life on campus. The Guild runs a number of activities including Prosh, Orientation Day (O-Day), End of Semester Shows and other major campus events. Guild Departments and Subsidiary Councils run other events, such as Multicultural Week and Spring Feast (run by the Multicultural Week department), Club Carnival (run by the Societies Council) and the PAC Pop-Up series of performances (run by the Public Affairs Council).

The Guild also supports and assists a network of more than 180 affiliated clubs and societies on campus, catering to a very wide range of interests (religious, theatrical, cultural etc.). The Guild also runs the majority catering outlets on campus, including the Tavern, as well as a second-hand bookshop and a volunteering centre. For most of the organisation's existence, it maintained a monopoly in on-campus catering, although in 2012, the first three independent catering outlets were introduced.

The Guild's Student Centre provides one-on-one academic advocacy, as well as financial counselling and interest-free loans.

Guild Council is the overall governing body of the Guild and consists of 23 voting members democratically elected at the annual Guild elections.

Guild Presidents 

1913 Sir John Winthrop Hackett	
1914 Mr JJ Fitzgerald	
1915 Mr JG Robertson	
1916 Mr HS Thompson	
1917 Mr J Shearer	
1918 Mr HT Stables	
1919 Mr AF Backhouse	
1920 Mr E Grace	
1921 Mr EW Gillett	
1922 Mr HPD Lyon	
1923 Mr F Maw	
1923 Mr TA Hartrey	
1924 Mr SG Demasson	
1925 Mr W Southern	
1926 Mr GL Throssell	
1927 Mr KL Cooper	
1928 Mr RG Wright	
1929 Mr AM Stewart	
1930 Mr RV Nevile	
1931 Mr HC Coombs	
1932 Mr C Sanders	
1933 Mr TG Wilsmore	
1934 Mr TH Roberts	
1935 Mr PWE Curtin	
1936 Mr GP Paterson	
1937 Mr NG Traylen	
1938 Mr H Giese	
1939 Mr S Johnson	
1940 Mr AJ Williams	
1941 Mr GB Hill	
1942 Mr FM Bennett	
1943 Mr JM Thomson	
1944 Mr AL Arcus	
1945 Mr FH Hibberd	
1946 Mr GE Ross	
1947 Mr DD Dunn	
1948 Mr PD Durack	
1949 Mr SB Rosier	
1950 Mr DE Hutchison	
1951 Mr JO Stone	
1952 Mr RJ Hawke 
1953 Mr BH Lochtenberg	
1953 Mr LG Wilson	
1954 Mr JH McConnell	
1955 Mr JFM Gillett	
1956 Mr EN Maslen	
1957 Mr JK Walsh	
1958 Mr KB Paterson	
1959 Mr RD Nicholson	
1960 Mr EM Palandri	
1961 Mr GG Harvey	
1962 Mr RSW Lugg	
1963 Mr AH Fels	
1964 Mr DR Williams	
1965 Mr SG Errington	
1966 Mr RB Alexander	
1967 Mr PG Edwards	
1968 Mr D MacKinlay	
1969 Ms SJD Boyd	
1970 Mr KC Beazley	
1971 Mr RJ Perry	
1972 Mr JA McGinty	
1973 Mr RB Porter	
1974 Mr PM Alexander	
1975 Mr DC Parker	
1976 Mr NG Roberts	
1977 Mr AD Fitzgerald	
1978 Mr WR Grace	
1979 Mr KW Strahan	
1980 Mr DN Anderson	
1981 Mr ERJ Dermer	
1982 Mr MW Rennie	
1983 Mr MJ Huston	
1984 Miss DE Willmott	
1985 Mr DJ Kelly	
1986 Mr MT Schaper	
1987 Miss JA Quinlivan	
1988 Mr AC Tomlinson	
1989 Mr MZ Sumich	
1990 Mr TL Smith	
1991 Bruce Baskerville	
1992 Justin Kennedy	
1993 Luke Forsyth	
1994 Sarah Haynes	
1995 Natalie Curling	
1996 Simon Freitag	
1997 James Fogarty	
1998 Rosie Dawkins	
1999 Emmanuel Hondros	
2000 Tim Huggins	
2001 Kristy Duckham	
2002 Ryan Batchelor	
2003 Myra Robinson	
2004 Susie Byers	
2005 Natalie Hepburn	
2006 Mathew Chuk	
2007 Dave de Hoog	
2008 Nik Barron	
2009 Dominic Rose	
2010 Emma Greeney	
2011 Tom Antoniazzi	
2012 Matthew Mckenzie	
2013 Cameron Barnes	
2014 Thomas Henderson	
2015 Lizzy O’Shea	
2016 Maddie Mulholland	
2017 Nevin Jayawardena	
2018 Megan Lee	
2019 Conrad Hogg	
2020 Brehany Shanahan	
2021 Emma Mezger 
2022 Amitabh Jeganathan

Annual elections 
Student representatives are elected to their positions by students in annual elections held in September. Elections are conducted by the Western Australian Electoral Commission. Both independent and party candidates run in the elections, with the historical bias leaning towards grouped members becoming elected. Elected office bearers take office as of 1 December in the year they are elected.

The 2016 Elections took place from 19 to 22 September 2016, and were for the 104th Guild Council. Three parties contested the 2016 elections: STAR, Launch and Left Action.

The 2019 Elections took place with  including a fast lane outside the major polling station of Reid library, reduction in the paper allowance per candidate, a lunch hour blackout and an International Student Services Debate. Six parties contested in the 2019 elections: Star, Launch, Left Action, Global, Liberation and Progress. The election had Star winning majority of seats followed by Global with 4 seats, Launch with 3 seats and Left Action with 1 Seat.

Controversies

Racism controversy

The 2013 edition of annual charity newspaper “Prosh” caused significant controversy when a racist article, "dream-time horoscopes" lead to a public relations disaster for the Guild, with major charity beneficiary ICEA withdrawing support from the paper.

Missing money
In May 2014 the Guild hired audit and tax firm BDO to investigate financial irregularities in the Guild's 2013 accounts, which found about $870,000 had been misappropriated.

Based on the initial findings of that investigation, a staff member was dismissed for serious misconduct. No action was taken against the President or other Office bearers at the time of the theft.

Guild structure 
The Guild is administered by a council of student representatives elected for one-year terms at the annual elections. There are twenty voting members of council, and several more non-voting members. Members may hold a voting and a non-voting role concurrently. Unlike some other campus unions, there is no financial compensation for student representatives, with the exception of the President who works at the Guild full-time during their term.

References

External sources 
https://www.uwastudentguild.com/

Student politics in Australia
Student Guild